David C J Cox (born 20 June 1970) is a male retired British gymnast. Cox competed in eight events at the 1992 Summer Olympics. He represented England and won a silver medal in the team event, at the 1990 Commonwealth Games in Auckland, New Zealand.

References

External links
 

1970 births
Living people
British male artistic gymnasts
Olympic gymnasts of Great Britain
Gymnasts at the 1992 Summer Olympics
Sportspeople from Johannesburg
Commonwealth Games medallists in gymnastics
Commonwealth Games silver medallists for England
Gymnasts at the 1990 Commonwealth Games
Medallists at the 1990 Commonwealth Games